Los Speakers (the Speakers) from Bogotá, Colombia, were a beat and garage rock band active the 1960s. Their particular style was characterized by the influence of early Beatles and the Byrds, as well as other popular music of the era. Later, they would experiment with other musical forms, such as psychedelic before their separation in late 1968.

While much of their recorded material consisted of covers of popular songs by acts such as the Beatles, not to mention other Latin American rock bands, such as Los Brincos, they began to write their own material as their sound evolved. Some of their original material would be characterized by ghostly downcast melodies and arrangements. Their albums are sought after among collectors, particularly their final LP, which is their most experimental.

The band began with the merging of two earlier groups, Dynamic (1961–1964), whose membership included Fernando Latorre, Alfredo Besoza and Humberto Monroy, and Electronic, whose roster included Luis and Edgar Duenas, children of the composer Luis Dueñas Knob.  The earliest lineup of the Speakers was Rodrigo Garcia, from Spain (guitar) Colombian Humberto Monroy (bass), Fernando Latorre (drums) and guitarists Oswaldo Hernandez and Luis Dueñas.  With this lineup, they supported Enrique Guzman, who was visiting Bogota, in 1964.  The Speakers became popular with the public during the beat group movement in Colombia .

The band
Rodrigo Garcia - Leader (1964–1969)
Humberto Monroy - Bass (1961–1969)
Roberto Fiorilli- Drums (1967–1969)
Oscar Lasprilla - Guitar (1967
Fernando Latorre - Drums (1961–1965)
Oswaldo Hernandez - Guitar (1964–1966)
Luis Dueñas - Guitar (1964–1966)
Edgar Dueñas - Drums (1966)

Discography
The Speakers (1965), Sello Vergara
La Casa Del Sol Naciente (1965), Discos Bambuco
Tuercas, Tornillos y Alicates (US Release 1966), Discos Bambuco
The Speakers IV (1967), Discos Bambuco
The Speakers En El Maravilloso Mundo De Ingeson (1968), Producciones Kriss

References

External links
Speaking of the Speakers

Colombian rock music groups
Musical groups from Bogotá
Musical groups established in 1963
Musical groups disestablished in 1969